Leucomphalos is a genus of flowering plants in the legume family, found in west Africa. It belongs to the subfamily Faboideae. Leucomphalos was traditionally assigned to the tribe Sophoreae; however, recent molecular phylogenetic analyses reassigned Leucomphalos to the Baphieae tribe.

Species
Leucomphalos comprises the following species:
 Leucomphalos brachycarpus (Harms) Breteler

 Leucomphalos capparideus Planch.

Species names with uncertain taxonomic status
The status of the following species is unresolved:
 Leucomphalos discolor (J.B.Hall) Breteler
 Leucomphalos libericus Breteler

References

Baphieae
Fabaceae genera